Julián Ramiro Fabelo (March 19, 1890 – death unknown) was a Cuban third baseman in the Negro leagues between 1916 and 1923.

A native of Santa Clara, Cuba, Fabelo played for Club Fé in the Cuban League in 1912–1913. He made his Negro leagues debut in 1916 for the Cuban Stars (East), and played several seasons for the Stars through 1923.

References

External links
 and Baseball-Reference Black Baseball stats and Seamheads
 Julian Fabelo at Negro League Baseball Players Association

1890 births
Place of death missing
Year of death missing
Club Fé players
Cuban Stars (East) players
Baseball infielders
People from Santa Clara, Cuba